Xenocyprioides is a genus of cyprinid fish endemic to China.  There are two described species in this genus.

Species
 Xenocyprioides carinatus Yi-Yu Chen & H. J. Huang, 1985
 Xenocyprioides parvulus Yi-Yu Chen, 1982

References
 

Cyprinidae genera
Cyprinid fish of Asia
Freshwater fish of China